LMT, Grupo Límite, or Límite, is a Mexican Norteño and Tejano band formed in Monterrey, Mexico in 1994. The group was led by singer Alicia Villarreal until she left to pursue a solo career.

History
The band debuted in 1995 with the record, Por Puro Amor (sung by Beatriz Alejo Jimenez)
, which sold over a million copies. The album featured singles such as "Vete", "Quiero", and "Te Aprovechas." Other subsequent albums were successful. At the 9th Lo Nuestro Awards, Límite received two awards: Regional Mexican Group of the Year and New Artist. The group's sound and look sparked a wave of copycats in Tejano & Norteño music. Grupo Límite's lead singer/songwriter Alicia Villarreal had her own catch phrase, a flirty "ah-hah", which quickly became part of the groups mystique, in addition to her blonde braids.

Members
Johanna Maldonado - Vocalist
Dayna Robles - Accordion, 
Kimberly Hidalgo - Keyboard
Edith Enriquez - Guitar
Carina Garcia - Bass Guitar
Mariah Cruz - Percussion
lizbeth Rios - Drums

Past members
Luis Mario Garza - Drums (1995-1997)
Alicia Villarreal - Vocalist (1995-2003)

Discography

Studio albums
Por Puro Amor (1995)
Partiéndome El Alma (1996)
Sentimientos (1997)
Canta Con Limite (1998)
De Corazón Al Corazón (1998)
Limite En Vivo (1999)
Por Encima De Todo (2000)
Soy Asi (2002)
Otra Vez (2013)
Tu Entretenimiento (2014)
Other albums
En Vivo - En Concierto (1999)
En Ultimo Concierto en Vivo  Limite (2005)
Limite en Concierto (2007)

Collaboration albums
El Baile Del Millón (with Caballo Dorado) (1998)
Invasores y Limite (with Los Invasores De Nuevo Leon) (2009)

Compilation albums
Coleccion Mi Historia (1997)
Serie Sensacional: La Sensación de Grupo Límite (2000)
Serie 32 (2000)
Edicion limitada (2002)
Oro Grupero (2002)
Gracias 1995-2003 (2003)
Encuentro Grupero (2004)
Las 32 Mas Grandes De... (2004)
Serie Top 10 (2004)
Explosion de Exitos (2006)
La Más Completa Colección (2007)
Serie Cinco Estrellas de Oro (2008)
La Historia de los Exitos (2008)
La Historia de los Exitos (2008)
Limite otra vez (2013) (ft. singer Liz Villanueva)
20 Kilates (2014)

References

Mexican norteño musical groups
Latin Grammy Award winners
1994 establishments in Mexico
Musical groups from Monterrey